Kennesaw Mountain High School is a public high school located in Kennesaw, Cobb County, Georgia, United States. It was founded in 2000 as a magnet school specializing in science and mathematics, and is one of sixteen high schools in the Cobb County School District.

History

Students
Kennesaw Mountain High School was founded in 2000. Before the school was built, juniors, as opposed to freshman and sophomores, from Harrison High School (the main output) were given the choice whether to stay at their current school or change to Kennesaw Mountain. Approximately 240 juniors decided to change, which was much more than expected.

Construction
Construction of the five buildings at the campus began in August 1999 and was completed in 14 months. The design, by Passantino & Bavier, Inc., used steel bowstring joists to allow for an arched roofline and the  clear span required for the gymnasium. Design and construction of the campus is the only Georgia project featured by the Steel Joist Institute. Included in the design, as requested by the school, was a plan so 70% of classrooms would have windows.

Magnet program

The Academy of Mathematics, Science, & Technology at Kennesaw Mountain is one of seven magnet schools at the high school level in the Cobb County School District. For the class of 2023, the Academy of Mathematics, Science, & Technology at Kennesaw Mountain had an acceptance rate of 52%, and the class of 2026, of those who where accepted into the Magnet Program had an average 8th grade PSAT 8/9 NPR of 93% for Math (520), and 92% for Evidence Based Reading and Writing (540).

Athletics
The Mustangs are a member of GHSA and participate in Region 6-AAAAAA. The school offers football, softball, cross country, volleyball, basketball, wrestling, swimming and diving, baseball, golf, marching band, lacrosse, soccer, tennis, and track and field.

Notable alumni
Corey Heim, racecar driver
Omar Jimenez, Journalist
Tyler Stephenson, Baseball Player

References

External links
 School website
 KMHS Magnet School

Schools in Cobb County, Georgia
Public high schools in Georgia (U.S. state)
Educational institutions established in 2000
Magnet schools in Georgia (U.S. state)
2000 establishments in Georgia (U.S. state)